The Mesri Mosque is a historical mosque in Isfahan, Iran. The mosque was built in 1650 in the Safavid era. There is an inscription in its mihrab, written by the famous calligrapher Mohammad Reza Emami in Nastaliq script.

See also 
List of the historical structures in the Isfahan province

References 

17th-century mosques
Mosques in Isfahan